Ramnarain Ruia Autonomous College is a college affiliated to the University of Mumbai, in Matunga, Mumbai, India. It was established in June 1937. The University of Mumbai granted autonomous status to Ramnarain Ruia College in year 2017. It comprises the Ramnarain Ruia College of Arts and Science which includes B. Voc course in Pharma analytical sciences under granted  permission by UGC and the Ramnivas Ruia Junior College of Arts and Science. The college has been awarded a five star rating by the National Assessment and Accreditation Council (NAAC) of India. Also, the NAAC accorded it the A+ Grade and a CGPA of 3.70 out of 4, which is the highest in the state. The college was given the 'Potential for Excellence' status in 2010-11. Additionally, in 2014, Ruia College was adjudged  a 'College of Excellence' by the University Grants Commission, New Delhi, and is the first College in the country to have received this status. Ruia college won the award for the best college given by University of Mumbai for the year 2006. It has been winning the trophy in the youth festival organized by Mumbai University for the last six consecutive years.

Academics
With its varied experience and diligence, the Ruia faculty was in a position to innovate and experiment soon after the college started functioning. Considerable emphasis was placed on development of the instructional program and evaluation procedures. Under several programs, such as COSIP (College Science Improvement Program) and COHSSIP (College Human and Social Science Improvement Program), Ruia has successfully implemented several innovative and experimental academic programs that won wide acclaim.

The senior college library has a large reading hall which accommodates about 400 students and the reading hall in junior college building accommodates about 200 students. Special facilities to borrow books and exam papers are available in these reading halls. The Open Shelf Library is an important unit of the library for Graduate students, with about 30,000 books readily available to students. The sub-sections are well categorized and meticulously laid out, and book selection is such as to be of great use to students specializing in different subjects. The college also provides instructional material on audio and videocassettes to the students through the audio-visual center and AV library.

The Information Technology Center is a fully equipped IT center, with 60 computers for students and 9 specially for staff members, offers a variety of courses very useful to the students and faculty. The Electronics Laboratory is a very well-equipped electronics lab, with multiple power supplies and a den containing all the necessary components for the students, it is well known throughout the state as one of the best electronic labs.

The Postgraduate Study and Research Center is the only Center of its kind to be established in a college in Mumbai, it provides comfortable accommodation, books, periodicals and bound copies of learned journals to postgraduate and research students. It is housed in the Ruia college library, which has a large collection of about 1,50,000 books, several of which are rare and not available elsewhere.

Another feature that distinguishes the college from others in the state is the Marathi Medium Unit. This unit of the college was launched to tackle a problem faced by several students coming from state board and university students: inability to understand what they are taught in English (medium of instruction) as they have done their schooling in Marathi.

Co-curricular activities
The Vidyarthi Pratinidhi Mandal (VPM) was founded to enable students of the college to be in close touch with the teacher and members of the management, the VPM was constituted as a student body in 1969. It has been highly successful in encouraging in student participation in a variety of co-curricular activities.

Numbering about 20, there are different Co-curricular Associations which enable students with varied interests to participate in intra- and inter-college activities and beyond, to tap their potential to the maximum. Ruia also has an excellent auditorium that can accommodate about 400 students. Another well-equipped 150-seat auditorium, with video projection facilities, has also been set up recently.

The Ruiaite (college magazine) has been published annually since 1937, earning for itself a reputation far beyond the aspirations of most other college magazines. It has won several prestigious awards over the years. The Gymkhana is fully equipped with badminton court, shooting range and highly sophisticated exercising equipment, made available for use by the students and faculty of the college.

Various annual inter-collegiate festivals are organized which have a special place in the students' hearts. "Utsav" and "Aarohan" being two such festivals. Apart from those two, various departments have their own festivals, collectively recognized as 'Samanvay'. These provide great opportunities for students to network, showcase their talent and learn from the experience.

Support for disadvantaged students
The Students Mutual Aid Fund (SMAF) was started in 1948 with the intention of helping out those deserving students who required financial assistance. It now extends benefits to the economically disadvantaged students through lunch coupons, paying fees and issuing sets of books on loan. It arranges exhibitions and other programmes to augment its funds.

There is also a Cell for Visually-Challenged Students (known as SVC by the Ruiates) in which the college has provided excellent facilities for the visually challenged - Robotron to read for the students, computer to translate as well as give printouts of Braille into English and a computer to talk to these students are great assets.

Courses

Undergraduate degree courses
 Bachelor of Science (BSc) (Statistics, Biochemistry, Mathematics, Physics, Chemistry, Biotechnology, Botany, Zoology, Life Science, Microbiology, Computer Science, Bio-analytical sciences)
 Bachelor of Arts (B.A.) (Economics, Political Science, Philosophy, English Literature, Sanskrit Literature, Hindi Literature, French Literature, Marathi Literature, Psychology, Mathematics & History)
Bachelor of Mass Media (B.M.M.)

Postgraduate courses
Master of Science (MSc) (Zoology, Botany, Chemistry, Biochemistry, Life Sciences, Biotechnology, Microbiology, Bioanalytical Sciences, Computer Science & Information Technology, Herbal Sciences and Physics)
Doctor of Philosophy (PhD) in Chemistry, Physics, Botany, Zoology, Life Science and History

Diploma courses
 Diploma in Information Technology
 Diploma in Bioinformatics
 Diploma in Travel and Tourism
 Diploma in Community Radio and Community Media Technology
 Post Graduate Diploma in Industrial Analytical Chemistry.
 Post Graduate Diploma in Public Relations and Communication
 Post Graduate Diploma in Business Journalism

Certification courses
 Certificate in Soft Skills and Personality Development
 Certificate in Entrepreneurship Development Skills
 Certificate in Heritage of Mumbai
 Certificate in Pharmacovigilance
 Certificate in Introductory Bioanalysis
 Certificate in Child Psychology
 Certificate in Food Science & Quality Control
 Certificate in Films -a language of Politics
 Certificate in Web Development Fundamentals
 Certificate in Aquascaping  and  Interiorscaping
 Certificate in Organic Gardening
and more

Notable alumni
Some of the notable alumni of the college include:

See also
 List of Mumbai Colleges

References

External links
Official Website
List of famous alumni
RCAA - The Official Alumni Website

University of Mumbai
Colleges in India
Educational institutions established in 1937
1937 establishments in India